The 1994 Northwestern Wildcats team represented Northwestern University during the 1994 NCAA Division I-A football season. In their third year under head coach Gary Barnett, the Wildcats compiled a 3–7–1 record (2–6 against Big Ten Conference opponents) and finished in eighth place in the Big Ten Conference.

The team's offensive leaders were quarterback Steve Schnur with 899 passing yards, Dennis Lundy with 1,189 rushing yards, and Mike Senters with 385 receiving yards.  Paul Burton was selected by the Associated Press as the first-team punter on the 1994 All-Big Ten Conference football team.

Schedule

Roster

Team players in the NFL

References

Northwestern
Northwestern Wildcats football seasons
Northwestern Wildcats football